"Howlin' for You" is a song by The Black Keys from the band's sixth album, Brothers.

Appearances in other media
"Howlin' for You" is featured on the soundtrack of the EA Sports video games, NHL 11, NHL Slapshot and Need for Speed Payback. The song has been featured in TV commercials and films for The Dilemma, Limitless, The Guilt Trip, Moneyball, Dark Shadows, Citizen Gangster, Deadpool, Venom: Let There Be Carnage, and The Bad Guys. It is used as the theme song to the Australian police drama television series, Cops L.A.C., and has been featured in American television series, CSI: Miami, Detroit 1-8-7, Entourage, Once Upon a Time, Prime Suspect, Chuck, Necessary Roughness, Suits, Lucifer, Secret Diary of a Call Girl and The Chicago Code. MLB's Toronto Blue Jays used it as their home run song (except for José Bautista), and the NHL's Arizona Coyotes use it as their goal song. The song was also featured in NBA 2K14 and The Crew 2.

The song was used in a feature on Sky Sports coverage of the 2014 Canadian Grand Prix. Samsung also used this in the Galaxy Note 8 promo and launch event livestream and is also being used in the ad for the Galaxy Note 8.

The song has also been used in the Honda CRV and Wells Fargo "Earning Your Trust" commercials.

The song's beat is similar to Gary Glitter's 1972 song "Rock and Roll (Part 2)".

Music video
An official video was released for the song. The music video—a parody of a sexploitation film trailer—was directed by Chris Marrs Piliero, starring Tricia Helfer, Diora Baird, Sean Patrick Flanery, Christian Serratos, Corbin Bernsen, Todd Bridges, and Shaun White, as well as Dan Auerbach and Patrick Carney of the band in the role of "Las Teclas de Negro" (translated from Spanish as "The Keys of Black").

A behind-the-scenes interview with Piliero, filmed during production of the video, has tongue-in-cheek commentary and brief clips of the cast members describing their characters.

The video was one of five nominees for the 2011 MTV Video Music Award for Best Rock Video.

Charts

Weekly charts

Year-end charts

References

2011 singles
The Black Keys songs
Songs written by Dan Auerbach
Songs written by Patrick Carney
Music videos directed by Chris Marrs Piliero